Greve Lake is an ice dammed lake in Chile formed by the advance of Brüggen Glacier. It is fed by several glaciers. Lautaro volcano is located in its vicinity.

References

Lakes of Magallanes Region
Lakes of Chile